Michele Martina (born 18 November 1996) is an Italian karateka. Born in Tivoli, he won the gold medal in the men's kumite 84 kg event at the 2018 European Karate Championships held in Novi Sad, Serbia.

Career 

At the 2018 Mediterranean Games held in Tarragona, Spain, he won one of the bronze medals in the men's kumite 84 kg event. In that same year, he won one of the bronze medals in the men's team kumite event at the 2018 World Karate Championships held in Madrid, Spain.

In 2019, he won one of the bronze medals in the men's kumite 84 kg event at the European Games held in Minsk, Belarus. In June 2021, he competed at the World Olympic Qualification Tournament held in Paris, France hoping to qualify for the 2020 Summer Olympics in Tokyo, Japan. In October 2021, he won the gold medal in his event at the 2021 Mediterranean Karate Championships held in Limassol, Cyprus. In November 2021, he competed in the men's 84 kg event at the World Karate Championships held in Dubai, United Arab Emirates.

He competed in the men's 84 kg event at the 2022 Mediterranean Games held in Oran, Algeria.

Achievements

References

External links 
 

Living people
1996 births
People from Tivoli, Lazio
Italian male karateka
European Games bronze medalists for Italy
European Games medalists in karate
Karateka at the 2019 European Games
Competitors at the 2018 Mediterranean Games
Competitors at the 2022 Mediterranean Games
Mediterranean Games bronze medalists for Italy
Mediterranean Games medalists in karate
Sportspeople from the Metropolitan City of Rome Capital
21st-century Italian people